Events in chess in 1988.

Top players

Kasparov and Karpov remained the top two players in the world, positions that they had held since July 1982.  Over the year, Dutch player Jan Timman and Alexander Beliavsky of the USSR moved up the list, whilst Andrei Sokolov from the USSR and Ljubomir Ljubojević of Yugoslavia moved down.

January 1988 FIDE rating list. Top 11 players

Events
The following major chess tournaments took place in 1988:

Grandmasters Association World Cup
The Grandmasters Association held six World Cup tournaments over 1988 and 1989, with some of the world's best players invited.  The first three of these tournaments were held in 1988.
 
 1 April – 22 April: The first tournament was held in Brussels and won by Karpov with 11/16, ahead of Valery Salov with 10.
 14 June – 3 July: The second tournament was held in Belfort, France, and won by Kasparov with 11½/15, ahead of Karpov with 10½.
 3 October – 24 October: The third tournament was held in Reykjavík and was again won by Kasparov, with 11/17.  Beliavsky was second, with 10½/15.

28th Chess Olympiad

The 28th Chess Olympiad in Thessaloniki, Greece, was held between 12 November and 30 November.  It was won by the USSR, ahead of England in second and the Netherlands in third.

The gold medal on the first board was won by Kasparov of USSR with 8½/10.  Lajos Portisch of Hungary was second, also scoring 8½, but from 11 games.

The Women's Chess Olympiad was held alongside the open tournament.  The winners were Hungary, ahead of the USSR and Yugoslavia.

Other major tournaments
23 February – 8 March: The Linares tournament was won by Timman with 8½/11, ahead of Beliavsky with 7.
6 September – 28 September: The 12th Tilburg tournament was won by Karpov with 10½/14, ahead of Short with 8½.
December 1988 – January 1989: The Reggio Emilia tournament was won by Mikhail Gurevich with 6½/9, ahead of Kiril Georgiev and Ulf Andersson Ivanchuk with 5½.
 The Wijk aan Zee tournament was won by Karpov with 9/13, ahead of Anderssen with 8½.

Titles awarded

Grandmaster
In 1989, FIDE awarded the Grandmaster title to the following 20 players:

Viswanathan Anand (born 1969) 
Zurab Azmaiparashvili (born 1960) 
Emir Dizdarevic (born 1958) 
Yury Dokhoian (1964–2021) 
Boris Gelfand (born 1968) 
Krum Georgiev (born 1958) 
Jörg Hickl (born 1965) 
Julian Hodgson (born 1963) 
Miguel Illescas (born 1963) 
Gregory Kaidanov (born 1959) /
Stefan Kindermann (born 1959) 
Josef Klinger (born 1967) 
Bogdan Lalić (born 1964) /
Valentin Lukov (born 1955) 
Gilberto Milos (born 1963) 
Michael Rohde (born 1959) 
Harry Schussler (born 1957) 
Elizbar Ubilava (born 1950) /
Reynaldo Vera (born 1961) 
Michael Wilder (born 1962) 

In addition George Koltanowski (born 1903) was awarded an honorary Grandmaster title in 1988.

Births
The following chess grandmasters were born in 1988:

9 January Viktor Láznička 
5 February Markus Ragger 
8 February Arik Braun 
14 February Evgeny Romanov 
14 February Adam Tukhaev 
3 March Timur Gareev 
11 March Ante Brkić 
11 March Alexandr Fier 
14 April Pawel Czarnota 
18 April Yuriy Ajrapetjan 
20 April Mark Bluvshtein 
21 April Subramanian Arun Prasad 
26 April Boban Bogosavljević 
26 April Rauf Mamedov 
30 April Denes Boros 
13 May Luka Lenič 
11 June Zhou Jianchao 
21 June Alejandro Ramírez 
7 July Wen Yang 
8 August Marin Bosiočić 
23 August Dmitry Kononenko 
6 September Valentin Iotov 
9 September Bassem Amin 
27 September David Baramidze 
11 November Yuri Vovk 
Anatoly Bykhovsky 
Nikolai Chadaev 
Laszlo Gonda 
Vitaliy Kiselev 
Daniel Alsina Leal 
Wojciech Moranda 
Ioannis Papadopoulos 
Pavel Ponkratov 
Deep Sengupta

Deaths
The following leading chess personality died in 1988:

30 June Bernardo Wexler (born 1925): Argentine International Master who was the 1959 national champion and played in three Olympiads.
27 November Jan Hein Donner (born 1927): Dutch Grandmaster who won the Dutch Championship in 1954, 1957 and 1958.

Other events
The German chess magazine, Deutsche Schachzeitung ceased publication in December 1988, having been published regularly since 1846.
The musical Chess premiered on Broadway in April 1988.  It closed in June 1988.

See also
Corus Chess Tournament
Linares chess tournament
List of strong chess tournaments

References

 
20th century in chess
Chess by year